William Shipman may refer to:

 William Davis Shipman (1818–1898), Federal Judge for the United States District Court for the District of Connecticut
 William Shipman (Medal of Honor) (1831–1894), U.S. Navy sailor and Medal of Honor recipient
 William Herbert Shipman (1854–1943), businessman on the island of Hawaii
 Bill Shipman (1886–1943), English cricketer